is a town located in Ama District, Aichi Prefecture, Japan. , the town had an estimated population of 32,318 in 13,683 households, and a population density of 4,904 persons per km².

Geography
Ōharu is located in western Aichi Prefecture, and has developed largely as a commuter town for the neighboring Nagoya metropolis.

Neighboring municipalities
Aichi Prefecture
Nakagawa-ku, Nagoya 
Nakamura-ku, Nagoya
Ama

Demographics
Per Japanese census data, the population of Ōharu has increased dramatically over the past 50 years.

Climate
The town has a climate characterized by hot and humid summers, and relatively mild winters (Köppen climate classification Cfa).

History
The village of Ōharu was established in 1889 with the establishment of the modern municipalities system. It was raised to town status in 1975. In 2008, discussions were held to merge Ōharu with neighboring Shippō, Jimokuji and Miwa towns. Later three municipalities formed the new city of Ama, but Ōharu withdrew from the negotiations, and remains an independent municipality.

Education
Ōharu has three public elementary schools and one public junior high school operated by the town government. The town does not have a high school.

Transportation

Railway
Ōharu is not served by any passenger rail transport.

Highway
  Nagoya Daini Kanjo Expressway

Noted people from Ōharu
Kaneyoshi Muto, naval aviator

References

External links

  

 
Towns in Aichi Prefecture